Brune Tavell (born 29 April 1974) is a Swedish footballer who plays as a midfielder for Swedish club FC Andrea Doria.

References

1974 births
Association football midfielders
Swedish footballers
Allsvenskan players
Superettan players
Malmö FF players
Living people